Shujaat Khan (born 27 January 1965) is a Bangladeshi activist. He is most notable for his work on recognizing Muslim school holidays in New York City.

Early life

Born in Dhaka, Shujaat Khan is the son of government class one officer A. W. Fazlul Bari Khan and A. J. Khaleedah.

The Bangladesh Liberation War had a profound effect on Shujaat Khan growing up. Beneath the casualties, destruction, and battles, Shujaat learned that the struggle for equality is very complicated and requires close participation with various political figures.

The struggle for independence, equality, and recognition influenced his Muslim School Holiday Campaign as well.

He describes himself as always being interested in science, politics, and human behavior. His favorite writer is Rabindranath Tagore.

He currently lives in the United States with his wife and two kids.

Beginnings of the Campaign for Muslim School Holidays

Shujaat Khan has been an essential part of recognizing Muslim school holidays in the New York City area.

In 1999, he was inspired to begin the campaign when his own children and relatives had to choose between celebrating the Eid holidays and going to school.

Principal Genie Calibar of P.S. 19 stated that a student who is absent for Eid-related purposes would receive an excused absence however, that was considered by many to be an unfair treatment of the matter considering that school would be officially closed for Christian and Jewish holidays but not for Islamic holidays.

Attention shifted towards the students affected by the nonclosure of school during the Eid holidays. Muslim students attending public schools who opted out of attending class to celebrate the Eid holidays missed class time, homework, and in many instances, missed exams which set them behind students of other religious backgrounds.

In 2006, the first Muslim School Holiday Campaign to successfully pass the Muslim School Holiday Resolution was launched by the New York Civic Participation Project followed by its allied coalitions. The resolution, numbered 1281 passed unanimously by elected officials in 2008. Mayor Michael Bloomberg vetoed Resolution 1281.

Five years after the veto, Mayor Bill de Blasio, who was then New York City Public Advocate, promised to recognize the two Muslim Holidays, Eid ul-Fitr and Eid ul-Adha.

Queens Community Forum

In March 2014, Shujaat Khan organized a Muslim holiday community forum at P.S. 69 in Queens, NY. At the event, New York City Council member Daniel Dromm was in attendance.

The forum's purpose was to gain recognition, inclusion, and respect among various political figures in New York City at the time. Events like these are described as being the backbone of the Campaign for Muslim School Holidays as they increased awareness among large, diverse groups of people, and garnered attention from the political climate of New York and, by extension, the U.S.

Forums and events such as this one often focused on the best course of action in recognizing Muslim school holidays in the New York City public school calendar. Rallies were held in Albany, meetings were held in various elected officials' offices, and forums were held in all five boroughs.

Shujaat Khan also wrote New York State Senator Jose Peralta an open letter pertaining to the recognition of Muslim school holidays throughout not just New York City, but also New York State.

These events focused on the students affected by the decision to choose between school and religion and focused on what an egalitarian society should look like—one that recognizes all religious groups' rights.

Recognition of Muslim School Holidays into the NYC Public School Calendar

In 2015, after 16 years of working with various institutions, political figures, religious leaders, and coalitions, Shujaat Khan, NYCPP, La Fuente, 32BJ SEIU were successful in recognizing the school holidays in the New York City public school calendar.

At a speech celebrating the victory, Shujaat Khan mentioned how the struggle for equality and recognition is not over but a huge step forward had been made.

References

External links
 Campaign for Muslim School Holidays Video
 Celebrating Eid in NYC Video

1965 births
Living people
Bangladeshi engineers